Deon Taylor is an American filmmaker. He is the founder of Hidden Empire Film Group.

Life
Deon Taylor was born in Chicago and grew up in Gary, Indiana. During high school, he with his brother and mother moved to Sacramento, California. He has stated, “Gary, Indiana is the murder capital of the world, so my entire freshman basketball team is dead."  He played basketball professionally, earning a spot in the NBA Entertainment League.

Taylor currently resides in Sacramento, California, filming there and Los Angeles.

Career
Taylor founded Hidden Empire Film Group in Sacramento, California and wrote and directed his first film, Dead Tone.  Taylor went on to shoot a horror series for BET, Nite Tales: The Series, a low budget series starring Flavor Flav that drew one million viewers on its first airing. Taylor’s slasher thriller Chain Letter was released to select theaters on October 1, 2010.

Nite Tales: The Movie was released on DVD in 2008 with a DVD release of the series pending in the future. Taylor has paired with Jamie Foxx to co-direct a future national television release titled Tommy's Little Girl.

Filmography

Films

Television

Music videos

References

External links
 Hidden Empire Film Group (official website)
 

African-American screenwriters
Screenwriters from California
African-American film directors
Writers from Sacramento, California
Living people
Film directors from California
Film directors from Illinois
Date of birth missing (living people)
Year of birth missing (living people)
21st-century African-American people